Hollywood Divas is an American reality television series that premiered on October 8, 2014, on TV One cable network. The show chronicles the lives of five African-American actresses. The series highlights the ups and downs of black actresses trying to navigate their career, family and relationships, while attempting to stay relevant in an unpredictable entertainment industry known for overlooking black talent. The premiere episode was the highest-rated episode ever for a TV One show with 1.2 million viewers, and most watched episode for any show on the network.

The series premiered on October 8, 2014. On December 18, 2014, TV One picked up the series for a second season, which premiered on July 15, 2015. The third season premiered on July 6, 2016.

Synopsis
The first season focuses on the lives of actresses Paula Jai Parker, Elise Neal, Golden Brooks, Countess Vaughn and producer, former Real Housewives of Atlanta star Lisa Wu. All five ladies get together to write, film and produce their own project called The White Sistas while dealing with drama.

In the second season, more drama unfolds concerning ownership rights of The White Sistas when the ladies try to get a deal for the project. The season ends with a showdown at the reunion with Lisa, Golden and Countess confronting Paula and her husband.

In the third season, Elise departed the show and Malika Haqq joined the cast, befriending Paula and pursuing an acting career. Lisa starts dating and tries to mend things with Paula. Paula gets the part she's been waiting for in Ray Donovan. Countess starts singing again but her friendship with Golden takes a rocky turn. Golden starts a swimsuit line and also receives a dream role that doesn't go well. The end of the season features a fiery reunion battle between Countess and Golden.

 Paula Jai Parker
 Golden Brooks
 Countess Vaughn
 Lisa Wu
 Elise Neal (seasons 1–2)
 Malika Haqq (season 3)

Episodes

Season 1 (2014)

Season 2 (2015)

Season 3 (2016)

References

External links
 
 
 

African-American reality television series
2010s American reality television series
2014 American television series debuts
English-language television shows
Television shows set in Los Angeles
TV One (American TV channel) original programming
2016 American television series endings